Billeswar is a census village in the Pachim Nalbari subdivision, Nalbari district, Assam, India. As per 2011 census of India, Billeswar village has a population of 2,699 people, including 1,408 males and 1,291 females, and a literacy rate of 76.84%.

The Billeswar temple, built by king Nagaksha, is a major attraction of visits to the village.

References 

Assam